Hilgenberg is a surname. Notable people with the surname include:

Herb Hilgenberg, Canadian meteorologist
Jay Hilgenberg (born 1959), American football player
Jerry Hilgenberg, American football player and coach
Joel Hilgenberg (born 1962), American football player
Steve Hilgenberg (1944–2011), American politician
Wally Hilgenberg (1942–2008), American football player